Elsewhere may refer to:

Film
 Elsewhere (2001 film), a 2001 Austrian documentary by Nikolaus Geyrhalter
 Elsewhere (2009 film), an American thriller starring Anna Kendrick
 Elsewhere (2019 film), an American comedy-drama directed by Hernán Jiménez

Literature
 Elsewhere, a 1991 novel by Will Shetterly
 Elsewhere (anthology), a 2003 Australian speculative-fiction anthology
 Elsewhere (Blatty novel), a 2009 novel by William Peter Blatty
 "Elsewhere" (short story), a 1941 science-fiction short story by Robert Heinlein
 Elsewhere (Zevin novel), a 2005 novel by Gabrielle Zevin
 Elsewhere: A Memoir, a 2012 memoir by novelist Richard Russo

Music
 Elsewhere, an EP by Gretta Ray, 2016
 Elsewhere (Scott Matthews album)
 Elsewhere (Joe Morris album)
 Elsewhere (Pinegrove album), 2017
 "Elsewhere", a song by Sarah McLachlan from Fumbling Towards Ecstasy

Places 
 Elsewhere, a museum and artist residency in Greensboro, North Carolina
 The name of a town in Calloway County, Kentucky
Elsewhere (music venue), music venue in Bushwick, Brooklyn

Other
 Elsewhere (website), a music, arts and travel website run by New Zealand journalist Graham Reid
 Elsewhere, the stage name of dancer David Bernal
 In special relativity, the region of spacetime outside a light cone
 Elsweyr, a fictional nation in the Elder Scrolls videogame series

See also
 St. Elsewhere, an American television drama series
 St. Elsewhere (album), a 2006 album by Gnarls Barkley
 Dispatches from Elsewhere, a 2020 American television drama series
 Somewhere Else (disambiguation)